Nathaniel Canson, also known as Nat Canson, is a Filipino former basketball player and coach.

A University of the East Warrior, Canson played for Crispa, Meralco, Manilabank, San Miguel, 7-Up and Toyota in the MICAA. After his stint with the Comets in 1973, he retired and worked as purchasing officer of Delta Heavy Machinery Corporation. In 1975, he returned to hard-court as coach and handled among others Crown Motors, Frigidaire, Man Diesel and Paul Jordan, Crispa's farm team.

Canson piloted the national team to fourth place in the 1982 New Delhi Asian Games. He called the shots for San Miguel Beer in the PBA in 1983-1984 and after his stint in the pro league, he handled the ESQ Merchants the following year in the PABL Challenge to Champions. Later on, Canson became coach of Hills Bros. in 1987, leading his squad to a runner-up finish and with new team Sta.Lucia Realtors in 1993.

In 2012, Canson coached the Indonesian under-18 team.

Coaching record

Professional

References

External links
UE Today

Filipino men's basketball players
Filipino men's basketball coaches
Alaska Aces (PBA) coaches
Living people
UE Red Warriors basketball players
Year of birth missing (living people)
San Miguel Beermen coaches
Sta. Lucia Realtors coaches